Krstac (Serbian Cyrillic: Крстац) is a mountain in central Serbia, near the town of Guča. Its highest peak Lis has an elevation of 699 meters above sea level.

References

Mountains of Serbia